George, Prince of Schaumburg-Lippe (10 October 1846 – 29 April 1911) was a ruler of the small Principality of Schaumburg-Lippe.

Biography
He was born in Bückeburg to Adolphus I, Prince of Schaumburg-Lippe and Princess Hermine of Waldeck and Pyrmont (1827–1910).

He succeeded as Prince of Schaumburg-Lippe on the death of his father on 8 May 1893 and reigned until his death on 29 April 1911 at Bückeburg and was succeeded by his son who became Adolphus II.

Family
George was married on 16 April 1882 at Altenburg to Princess Marie Anne of Saxe-Altenburg, a daughter of Prince Maurice of Saxe-Altenburg.

They had nine children:

Prince Adolf II (1883–1936)
Prince Moritz Georg (1884–1920)
Prince Peter (1886-1886)
Prince Wolrad (1887–1962)
Prince Stephan (1891–1965)
Prince Heinrich (1894–1952)
Princess Margaretha (1896–1897)
Prince Friedrich Christian (1906–1983)
Princess Elisabeth (1908–1933)

Silver wedding anniversary
On the occasion of their silver wedding anniversary in 1907, Emperor Wilhelm II presented to Georg and Marie Anne the family ancestral seat, Schaumburg Castle. The castle had been controlled by the Hohenzollerns ever since Georg's grandfather sided with the Austrians in the 1866 Austro-Prussian War. The gift was also meant to be in recognition of Georg's support in the dispute over the succession to the Lippe-Detmold throne.

Orders and decorations
  Kingdom of Prussia:
 Knight of the Order of the Red Eagle, 1st Class, 8 January 1867
 Knight of Honour of the Johanniter Order, 27 July 1884
 Knight of the Order of the Black Eagle, 6 January 1894; with Collar, 17 January 1894
 : Grand Cross of the Order of the Württemberg Crown, 1872
 :
 Knight of the House Order of Fidelity, 1893
 Knight of the Order of Berthold the First, 1893
 : Knight of the Royal Order of Saint Hubert, 1893
 : Knight of the Order of the Rue Crown, 1895
 : Knight of the Order of the Elephant, 5 May 1896
   Austria-Hungary: Grand Cross of the Royal Hungarian Order of St. Stephen, 1899

Ancestry

References

External links

1846 births
1911 deaths
People from Bückeburg
House of Lippe
People from Schaumburg-Lippe
Princes of Schaumburg-Lippe
Grand Crosses of the Order of Saint Stephen of Hungary